Cau Ngang is a district (huyện) of Trà Vinh province in the Mekong Delta region of Vietnam.

As of 2003 the district had a population of 133,501. The district covers an area of 322 km². The district capital lies at Cầu Ngang.

References

Districts of Trà Vinh province